Roseland  is a town in Clay Township, St. Joseph County, in the U.S. state of Indiana. The population was 630 at the 2010 Census. It is part of the South Bend–Mishawaka, IN-MI, Metropolitan Statistical Area.

Roseland is known as "The Gateway Town", on account of its location at the Notre Dame/South Bend exit of the Indiana Toll Road (Interstate 80/90).

Geography

Demographics

2010 census
As of the census of 2010, there were 630 people, 287 households, and 148 families living in the town. The racial makeup of the town was 87.5% White, 2.7% African American, 1.0% Native American, 4.6% Asian, 0.2% Pacific Islander, 1.9% from other races, and 2.2% from two or more races. Hispanic or Latino of any race were 5.1% of the population.

There were 287 households, of which 20.6% had children under the age of 18 living with them, 40.8% were married couples living together, 6.6% had a female householder with no husband present, 4.2% had a male householder with no wife present, and 48.4% were non-families. 32.8% of all households were made up of individuals, and 9.8% had someone living alone who was 65 years of age or older. The average household size was 2.20 and the average family size was 2.71.

The median age in the town was 35.2 years. 14.3% of residents were under the age of 18; 16.5% were between the ages of 18 and 24; 30% were from 25 to 44; 26.1% were from 45 to 64; and 13.2% were 65 years of age or older. The gender makeup of the town was 48.9% male and 51.1% female.

2000 census
As of the census of 2000, there were 645 people (corrected count), 311 households, and 171 families living in the town. The racial makeup of the town was 91.60% White, 1.16% African American, 0.61% Native American, 2.16% Asian, 2.93% from other races, and 1.55% from two or more races. Hispanic or Latino of any race were 5.31% of the population.

There were 311 households, out of which 20.9% had children under the age of 18 living with them, 43.4% were married couples living together, 8.0% had a female householder with no husband present, and 44.7% were non-families. 37.9% of all households were made up of individuals, and 12.9% had someone living alone who was 65 years of age or older. The average household size was 2.06 and the average family size was 2.73.

In the town, the population was spread out, with 6.4% under the age of 18, 66.4% from 18 to 24, 13.2% from 25 to 44, 7.7% from 45 to 64, and 6.3% who were 65 years of age or older. The median age was 21 years. For every 100 females, there were 21.1 males. For every 100 females age 18 and over, there were 18.5 males.

The median income for a household in the town was $33,214, and the median income for a family was $38,750. Males had a median income of $35,000 versus $23,611 for females. The per capita income for the town was $9,450. About 5.1% of families and 5.7% of the population were below the poverty line, including 7.7% of those under age 18 and 3.7% of those age 65 or over.

Government
Roseland was incorporated in 1916.  The town has three council members and a clerk treasurer.

Education
Roseland is in the South Bend Community School Corporation (SBCSC). 

The school zonings are as follows: Darden Elementary School Edison Middle School and Clay High School.

Previously residents were zoned as follows based on their street location: Darden Primary, Tarkington Traditional Elementary, Clay Intermediate or Brown Intermediate (depending on the section), and Clay High.

See also
 LaSalle Trail

References

External links
 Town of Roseland, Indiana website
 Private Roseland website
  The Roseland Saga - South Bend Tribune special archive
 Compendium of Roseland press coverage
 Town of Roseland May Get Help (Indiana Law Blog)
 IN.gov
 IN.gov
 WVPE.org (Celtic Festival)

Towns in St. Joseph County, Indiana
Towns in Indiana
South Bend – Mishawaka metropolitan area